Glazman is a surname. Notable people with the surname include:

 Daniel Glazman (born 1967), French software developer
 Josef Glazman (1913–1943), Lithuanian Jewish resistance leader
 Roman Glazman, Russian-American physicist and oceanographer

See also
 Glasman
 Glassman